Bonkaram may refer to:
 Bonkaram, Hormozgan
 Bonkaram, Kerman